Mohamed Mustafa Mohamed Ahmed (born 19 February 1996) is a Sudanese professional footballer who plays as a goalkeeper for Al-Merrikh and the Sudan national football team.

References 

1996 births
Living people
Sudanese footballers
Sudan international footballers
Association football goalkeepers
Al-Merrikh SC players
Al-Ahli Club (Atbara) players
2021 Africa Cup of Nations players
2022 African Nations Championship players
Sudan A' international footballers